The 2021–22 Aston Villa W.F.C. season was the club's 26th season under their Aston Villa affiliation, the organisation's 48th overall season in existence and their second season in the FA Women's Super League. Along with competing in the WSL, the club also contested two domestic cup competitions: the FA Cup and the League Cup.

On 20 May 2021, Carla Ward was named as manager having resigned as manager of WSL rivals Birmingham City a week earlier. She replaced interim manager Marcus Bignot and departing head coach Gemma Davies who were both sacked at the end of the previous season.

Current squad

Preseason

FA Women's Super League

Results summary

Results by matchday

Results

League table

Women's FA Cup 

As a member of the first tier, Aston Villa entered the FA Cup in the fourth round proper.

FA Women's League Cup

Group stage

Squad statistics

Appearances 

Starting appearances are listed first, followed by substitute appearances after the + symbol where applicable.

|-
|colspan="14"|Players away from the club on loan:

|-
|colspan="14"|Players who appeared for the club but left during the season:

|}

Transfers

Transfers in

Loans in

Transfers out

Loans out

References

External links 
 AVFC Women official website

Aston Villa W.F.C. seasons
Aston Villa